Girardville is a municipality in the Canadian province of Quebec, located within the regional county municipality of Maria-Chapdelaine. The municipality had a population of 1,018 in the Canada 2021 Census.

Demographics
Population trend:
 Population in 2021: 1018 (2016 to 2021 population change: 3%)
 Population in 2016: 988 
 Population in 2011: 1100 
 Population in 2006: 1186
 Population in 2001: 1285
 Population in 1996: 1350
 Population in 1991: 1391

Private dwellings occupied by usual residents: 470 (total dwellings: 511)

Mother tongue:
 English as first language: 0.5%
 French as first language: 99%
 English and French as first language: 0%
 Other as first language: 0.5%

References

External links

Municipalities in Quebec
Incorporated places in Saguenay–Lac-Saint-Jean
Maria-Chapdelaine Regional County Municipality